HMAS Mildura (J207/M207), named for the city of Mildura, Victoria, was one of 60 s constructed during World War II, and one of 36 initially manned and commissioned by the Royal Australian Navy (RAN). The ship was laid down by Morts Dock & Engineering Co in 1940 and commissioned into the RAN in 1941.

Milduras initial deployments were on the east coast of Australia as a convoy escort and anti-submarine patrol vessel. At the start of 1944, she escorted vessels between Townsville, Queensland and New Guinea. Late 1944 saw the ship relocated to Fremantle, Western Australia as a local patrol ship. After a refit at the start of 1945, Mildura was based at Morotai, and operated throughout the Dutch East Indies until August, when the corvette was sent to clear Hong Kong waters of mines. During September and October, the mine warfare area increased to include Chinese waters. In late October, Mildura returned to Sydney for refitting, then spent the next two years clearing mines around Australia, New Guinea, and the Solomon Islands.

The corvette was paid off in 1948, but was recommissioned in 1951 to serve as a training vessel for National Service trainees. Mildura was decommissioned again in 1953, then was towed to Brisbane for use as a training hulk for local reservists. The ship was sold for scrap in 1965.

Design and construction

In 1938, the Australian Commonwealth Naval Board (ACNB) identified the need for a general purpose 'local defence vessel' capable of both anti-submarine and mine-warfare duties, while easy to construct and operate. Construction of the prototype  did not go ahead, but the plans were retained. The need for locally built 'all-rounder' vessels at the start of World War II saw the "Australian Minesweepers" (designated as such to hide their anti-submarine capability, but popularly referred to as "corvettes") approved in September 1939, with 60 constructed during the course of the war: 36 (including Mildura) ordered by the RAN, 20 ordered by the British Admiralty but manned and commissioned as RAN vessels, and 4 for the Royal Indian Navy.

Main armament for the corvette consisted of one 4-inch high-angle gun, supplemented by three 20 mm Oerlikon cannons (one of which was later replaced by a 40 mm Bofors gun), plus machine guns. Depth charge chutes and throwers were also fitted. The ship's company consisted of 85 personnel.

Mildura was laid down by Morts Dock & Engineering Co in Sydney on 23 September 1940. She was launched on 15 March 1941 by the wife of Commodore John Walter Durnford, the Second Naval Member of the Australian Commonwealth Naval Board, and commissioned on 23 July 1941.

Operational history
Mildura was initially assigned to the 20th Minesweeping Flotilla until its disbandment in late 1941. The ship then operated independently on minesweeping, convoy escort, and anti-submarine patrols throughout Australian and South Pacific waters. In September 1942, Mildura was reassigned as a dedicated escort vessel for merchant convoys on the eastern Australian coast. In January 1943, the corvette recovered and towed the American merchant ship  after the latter was torpedoed off Sydney. On 8 February,  was torpedoed while part of a convoy escorted by Mildura. In January 1944, Mildura was reassigned to patrol duties in Queensland waters, with regular detachments to escort convoys between Townsville and New Guinea. This continued until August 1944, when the corvette was relocated to Western Australia and assigned to patrols of the vicinity around Fremantle.

At the start of 1945, Mildura was refitted, then in March assigned to Morotai. The ship's main roles were to patrol the vicinity of the island, and to shepherd convoys between Morotai and Biak. On 22 June, the ship was sent to Borneo to provide nighttime patrols of Tarakan Harbour's approaches. She was reassigned back to Morotai at the end of June. During the return voyage, the ship diverted after spotting a crashed PBY Catalina on Makheli Island. A group of natives reported that the aircrew had been rescued by another aircraft, but requested that they themselves be evacuated because they had come to the attention of the Japanese. The six natives were transported to Morotai.

After spending July based in Morotai, followed by two weeks as guardship at Balikpapan, Mildura met seven other Bathurst-class corvettes at Subic Bay, then proceeded as a group to sweep Hong Kong waters of mines from 30 August. Other duties the corvette was involved in during the Japanese surrender of Hong Kong included patrols, the pursuit and seizure of small craft, and overseeing the transfer of the Hong Kong brewery from Japanese to Allied hands. In mid-September, the Hong Kong minesweeping force was rolled into the 21st Minesweeping Flotilla, which was tasked with clearing Chinese waters of mines. This continued until 17 October, and on 20 October, Mildura departed Hong Kong for Sydney. She arrived on 19 November and was docked for refit until February 1946. Mildura joined the 20th Minesweeping Flotilla in clearing mines around Australia, New Guinea, and the Solomon Islands until October 1947. The corvette received two battle honours for her wartime service: "Pacific 1941–45" and "New Guinea 1943–44".

Mildura was paid off to reserve at Fremantle, Western Australia on 21 May 1948 but was recommissioned on 20 February 1951 for use as a training ship for National Service trainees. She continued in this role until 1953.

Decommissioning and fate
Mildura paid off again at Melbourne on 11 September 1953. The ship was sold for scrap to Brisbane Non-Ferrous on 8 September 1965.

Citations

References

Books

Journal and news articles

External links

Bathurst-class corvettes of the Royal Australian Navy
Ships built in New South Wales
1941 ships
World War II corvettes of Australia
Training ships of the Royal Australian Navy